The following is a list of films produced in the Tamil film industry in India in 1947, in alphabetical order.

1947

References 

Films, Tamil
Lists of 1947 films by country or language
1947
1940s Tamil-language films